Thrice Resurrected is a 1960 Soviet drama film directed by Leonid Gaidai.

Plot 
In 1919, a group of Komsomol members were sent on a tugboat to fight with the White Guards. During the Battle of the Volga people used this ship to transport wounded soldiers and children. And now the pioneers and Komsomol members of the Volga decide to make repairs on the ship and go on it on a journey.

Cast 
 Alla Larionova – Svetlana Sergeyevna
 Georgi Kulikov – Arkady Nikolayevich Shmelyov
 Natalya Medvedeva – Anna Mikhailovna Shmelyova
 Vsevolod Sanayev – Ivan Aleksandrovich Starodub
 Konstantin Sorokin – Vasily Vasilyevich Kiselyov
 Nikolay Bogolyubov – Kazansky
 Nadezhda Rumyantseva – Lyubasha Solovyova
 Nina Grebeshkova – Zoya Nikolayevna
 Nikolai Pogodin – Nikolai
Gennady Pavlov – Anton (voiced by Yuri Sarantsev)
Leonid Gaidai – inventor (uncredited)
Nikolai Rybnikov – Nikolai Shmelyov (uncredited)

References

External links 
 

1960 drama films
1960 films
Films directed by Leonid Gaidai
Russian black-and-white films
Russian drama films
1960s Russian-language films
Soviet black-and-white films
Soviet drama films